The siege of Uehara was the first of many steps taken by Takeda Shingen in his bid to seize control of Shinano Province. Uehara Castle had been controlled by Suwa Yorishige before it was taken by Shingen.

References

Turnbull, Stephen (1998). 'The Samurai Sourcebook'. London: Cassell & Co.

1542 in Japan
Uehara 1542
Uehara 1542
Conflicts in 1542